The discography of American country artist Jack Greene contains 24 studio albums, one live album, four compilation albums, 40 singles and five other charted songs. He gained national attention as a drummer and background vocalist in Ernest Tubb's band. He soon signed a recording contract with Decca Records. Greene's second single, "Ever Since My Baby Went Away", became his first song to chart, reaching number 37 on the Billboard Hot Country Singles chart. Greene's next single, "There Goes My Everything", reached number 1 on the Billboard country chart in December 1966. Becoming his biggest hit, the song also was his only single to reach the Billboard Hot 100, peaking at number 65. 

The song's success led to a string of singles that reached top ten, including a series of number one hits. Greene's number one singles during this time were "All the Time", "You Are My Treasure", "Until My Dreams Come True" and "Statue of a Fool". At the same time, Greene released a series of studio albums that became successful. His debut album (also titled There Goes My Everything) reached number 1 on the Billboard Top Country Albums chart in February 1967. Other studio albums Greene issued reached the top ten of the country albums chart. Among these studio albums was All the Time (1967), You Are My Treasure (1968), Until My Dreams Come True (1969) and Statue of a Fool (1969). In 1969, Greene paired up with Jeannie Seely to release the single "Wish I Didn't Have to Miss You", which became a major hit. Together, the pair released a series of albums, beginning with Jack Greene, Jeannie Seely in 1970. The album reached number 18 on the country albums list. 

As a solo artist, Greene continued having successful singles in the early 1970s. Among these hits included the number 13 "There's a Lot About a Woman That a Man Don't Know" (1970), the number 15 "Something Unseen" (1970) and the number 17 "Satisfaction" (1971). Greene continued recording with Decca (later MCA Records) until 1976. His final studio album with the label was Greene Country (1972), which reached number 21 on the country albums chart. Greene returned with a studio album in 1980 entitled Yours for the Taking on Firstline Records. Its title track was released as a single and reached the top 40 of the Billboard country chart. Greene continued releasing albums and singles during the 1980s. His single, "If It's Love (Then Bet It All)" was his final chart appearance on the Billboard country songs chart.

Albums

Studio albums

Live albums

Compilation albums

Singles

Other charted songs

Notes

References

Country music discographies
Discographies of American artists